Zribi is a Tunisian surname.

The etymology of the family name Zribi can refer to a person from the island of Djerba in Tunisia (also known as Zerbi or Gerbi up until the 19th century). It can also refer to a person from the ancient thermal citadel-city of Zriba in Tunisia.
Some trace the origin to the City of Hamma near Gabes in South Tunisia.

See also
 Anne Zribi-Hertz, PhD in linguistics
 Ben Messaoud Ben Rehouma Zribi (1894-1915), french soldier killed in action during the First World War
 Isabelle Zribi (1974- ), french author ;
 Lamia Zribi (born 1961)—Tunisian politician and minister of finance of Tunisia from 2016 to 2017
 Salem Zribi (born 1939)—Tunisian free thinker, writer and teacher. Published several books notably after the 2011 Arab spring
 Sofiane Zribi, founder and president of the tunisian association of private practice psychiatrists and president of the french federation of the associations of private practice psychiatrists 
 Walid Zribi, Tunisian journalist and producer;
 Yousra Zribi (1983- ), Tunisian judoka.

References

Surnames of Tunisian origin